Elytroleptus scabricollis is a species of beetle in the family Cerambycidae. It was described by Henry Walter Bates in 1892.

References

Elytroleptus
Beetles described in 1892